The prime minister of the Czech Republic (Czech: Předseda vlády České republiky) is the head of the government of the Czech Republic. The prime minister is the de facto leader of the executive branch, chairs the Cabinet and selects its ministers.

The prime minister is selected by the president and stays in office only as long as they retain and command the support of a majority of members of the Chamber of Deputies. As such, the prime minister is usually the leader of the largest party or a coalition in the Chamber of Deputies.

The current prime minister, Petr Fiala, leader of the ODS, was appointed by President Miloš Zeman on 28 November 2021, following the 2021 Czech legislative election and serves as 13th person in the office.

Powers and role

Since the Czech Republic is a parliamentary republic, the prime minister and their government are accountable to the Chamber of Deputies of the Parliament. The Czech constitution provides that upon the accession to the office each prime minister must gain and thereafter maintain the confidence of the Parliament. As soon as the prime minister loses the confidence they are forced to resign and the president is obliged to choose a new prime minister.

The prime minister is the most powerful office in state, since they command and preside over the government. The president appoints the prime minister who appoints other ministers of the Cabinet of the Czech Republic.

Residence

The official residence of the prime minister of the Czech Republic is Kramář's Villa (Czech: Kramářova vila). The residence is located at Gogolova 212/1 in the Hradčany district of Prague.

The building was built from 1911 to 1914. It was designed by the Viennese architect Friedrich Ohmann.

List of heads of government

Notes

References

 
Government of the Czech Republic
1993 establishments in the Czech Republic